Hilarographa charagmotorna is a species of moth of the family Tortricidae. It is found in Bolivia.

Etymology
The name refers to the colouration of the moth and is derived from Greek charagma (meaning mark) and Latin torno (meaning I turn).

References

Moths described in 2009
Hilarographini